Harty is a surname. Notable people with the surname include:

 Herbert Hamilton Harty (1879–1941), Irish and British composer, conductor, pianist and organist
 Ian Harty (born 1978), Scottish footballer 
 Jeremiah James Harty (1853–1927), Catholic Archbishop of Manila and Bishop of Nebraska.
 John Harty (born 1958), former American football defensive tackle
 Martin Harty, member of the New Hampshire House of Representatives
 Maura Harty (born c. 1959), United States Assistant Secretary of State for Consular Affairs
 Patricia Harty, Irish-American journalist
 Patricia Harty (born 1941), American actress and dancer
 Rhett Harty (born 1970), American soccer defender
 Robert Harty (1779–1832), British politician and Whig Member of Parliament 
 Russell Harty (1934–1988), English television presenter
 William Harty (1847–1929), Ontario businessman and politician.

See also
 Harty, Kent, England
 Harty, Ontario, Canada, a community in the township of Val Rita-Harty
 Hearty